Toma is a department or commune of Nayala Province in western Burkina Faso. Its capital is the town of Toma. According to the 2019 census the department has a total population of 39,109.

Towns and villages
Toma	(15,851 inhabitants) (capital)
 Goa	(651 inhabitants)
 Goussi	(516 inhabitants)
 Koin	(3,330 inhabitants)
 Kolan	(955 inhabitants)
 Konti	(345 inhabitants)
 Niémé	(650 inhabitants)
 Nyon	(551 inhabitants)
 Pankélé	(1,934 inhabitants)
 Raotenga	(242 inhabitants)
 Sawa	(848 inhabitants)
 Semba	(531 inhabitants)
 Sien	(707 inhabitants)
 Siépa	(730 inhabitants)
 Tô	(1,354 inhabitants)
 Yayo	(175 inhabitants)
 Zouma	(2,964 inhabitants)

References

Departments of Burkina Faso
Nayala Province